The Régie du cinéma was a provincial film classification organization responsible for the motion picture rating system within the Canadian province of Quebec. Existing in several guises since the start of the 20th century, the organization came into being in its final form as a department of the Government of Quebec's Ministry of Culture and Communications (MCC) on 23 June 1983. Its roles were merged and fully integrated into the MCC on 1 April 2017. Its mandate was to classify and approve films for distribution to Quebec's movie theatres and home video outlets. Its purview devolved from the Cinema Act (RSQ, C-18.1). As of 2010, the organization had a net income of 7 million dollars and had accumulated more than 85 million dollars in cash in their bank account.

Rating system
The Régie du cinéma rates all films and videos. The same classifications are used for television broadcasts, who make their own determinations as to a program's rating.

The current ratings are:

Each rating can also include one or a number of complementary indications. The possible combinations are as follows:

G rated films usually can have some swearing in them, as long as the offensive language is not prevalent throughout. Violence can also be permitted, but only in a fantasy context. Sex can be present as long as it is filmed with extreme maintenance. Horror elements can be present, but have to be filmed in a way that would not scare children under 13 years of age. In cases where objectionable material can be found, the Not recommended for young children tag, which indicates that the movie could contain material inappropriate for young children but does not prohibit them from viewing the film, is added to the original rating.

13+ rated films usually have content that likely would not be suitable for young children. Typically, scenes of violence that are darker than what is depicted in traditional fantasy films warrant a 13+ rating. As opposed to G movies, strong horror elements can be present; these are usually accompanied with the Horror tag. Vulgar Language is more prevalent and scenes of sexual acts or nudity can be more explicit.

16+ rated films are usually movies with more explicit violence than what a 13+ movie can afford. Most of these cases, a movie deals with extreme violence. In some cases, it can be for sex and nudity, and that rating usually occurs to soft-core pornography. Horror elements can also be present, although in these cases, they are mostly mixed with violence. In rare cases, a movie is rated 16+ for the language it uses.

18+ rated films are mostly hard-core or soft-core pornography movies, but they can also feature movies of extreme violence and gore. It is rare that a normal movie will get an 18+ rating for the language or horror elements it has. Sometimes, nudity and sex is strong enough to warrant an 18+ rating without going into the edges of pornography, but is usually accompanied by another indication, such as violence.

Movies that have not yet been rated feature the indication En attente de classement (Rating Pending). This is common on print advertising before the release of a movie. The movie must have been rated by the Régie by the time it is released.

While not a classification per se, educational or pedagogical movies, sport and physical exercise programs, and promotional materials are exempt from classification.

The Régie does not cut sequences from movies; they are rated in the format provided by the production company. Nonetheless, the Régie has the authority to deny classification, in which case the movie cannot be distributed in any format in the province of Québec. Such movies usually feature inhumane sexual exploitation.

See also
 Canadian motion picture rating system
 Canadian Home Video Rating System, the English-speaking equivalent of the Régie's ratings for home video materials

References

External links
  
  Régie du cinéma ratings database (includes a brief description of each movie and a rationale for the rating)

Canadian motion picture rating systems
Quebec government departments and agencies
Entertainment rating organizations
Motion picture rating systems
Cinema of Quebec